Monticello is a college town in, and the county seat of, Drew County, Arkansas, United States. As of the 2010 census it had a population of 9,467. Founded in 1849 in the Arkansas Timberlands near the Arkansas Delta region, the city has long been a commercial, cultural and educational hub for southeast Arkansas. With a historically agriculture- and silviculture-based economy, Monticello has diversified to include growth from the medical sector and the University of Arkansas at Monticello (UAM).

History
When Drew County was formed in 1846, its citizens decided that a new town should be built to serve as the county seat. In 1849, land was donated for the town site. The first courthouse was built in 1851, and a second courthouse was erected in 1857. 

Two trials were held in that courthouse in March and September 1859 to consider whether the slave Abby Guy ought to be freed. She said that a former master had manumitted her but that years later, she was illegally kidnapped and re-enslaved by his brother. The first trial in her freedom suit resulted in a hung jury, but the second jury of twelve local white men found in her favor. Top lawyers worked on her case, and she married another white man who assisted her. The case was appealed to the state supreme court, which ruled in Guy's favor. Guy was set free as were her children  because they were born to a free woman.

During the Civil War, several small skirmishes were fought around Monticello. The Rodger's Female Academy was used as a hospital for Confederate soldiers.

Geography
Monticello is located west of the center of Drew County at  (33.627183, −91.793787). U.S. Routes 425 and 278 intersect in the city, west of downtown. U.S. 425 leads north  to Pine Bluff and south  to Hamburg, while US 278 leads west  to Warren and east  to McGehee. In the future, I-530 is planned to be extended and end at the proposed I-69 west of Monticello. Only part of future I-69 that is built is US 278 bypass named "Monticello Bypass." It is a two-lane expressway. A portion of future I-530 is opened as AR 530 and is a two-lane expressway.

Climate
Monticello lies in the humid subtropical climate zone (Köppen Cfa). The climate in this area is characterized by hot, humid summers and generally mild to cool winters.

Demographics

2020 census

As of the 2020 United States census, there were 8,442 people, 3,703 households, and 2,104 families residing in the city.

2000 census
As of the census of 2000, there were 9,146 people, 3,592 households, and 2,316 families residing in the city. The racial makeup of the city was 64.96% White, 32.62% Black or African American, 0.15% Native American, 0.70% Asian, 0.01% Pacific Islander, 0.58% from other races, and 0.98% from two or more races. Hispanic or Latino of any race were 1.29% of the population.

There were 3,592 households, out of which 32.5% had children under the age of 18 living with them, 42.5% were married couples living together, 18.3% had a female householder with no husband present, and 35.5% were non-families. 29.3% of all households were made up of individuals, and 11.2% had someone living alone who was 65 years of age or older.  The average household size was 2.37 and the average family size was 2.94.

In the city, the population was spread out, with 25.8% under the age of 18, 16.1% from 18 to 24, 25.9% from 25 to 44, 18.7% from 45 to 64, and 13.4% who were 65 years of age or older.  The median age was 31 years. For every 100 females, there were 87.2 males.  For every 100 females age 18 and over, there were 83.5 males.

The median income for a household in the city was $26,821, and the median income for a family was $36,615. Males had a median income of $32,029 versus $21,546 for females. The per capita income for the city was $16,113.  About 14.8% of families and 20.1% of the population were below the poverty line, including 24.5% of those under age 18 and 20.2% of those age 65 or over.

Government
Monticello operates under a mayor-council government, with two aldermen representing the city's four wards on the city council. Aldermen are elected to two-year terms. The mayor, city attorney, and municipal judge are elected to four-year terms.

Education

Primary and secondary
Most of Monticello is served by the Monticello School District while small portions are served by the Drew Central School District.

The Monticello School District consists of Monticello Elementary School (grades K to 2), Monticello Intermediate School (grades 3 to 5) Monticello Middle School (grades 6 to 8), and Monticello High School (grades 9 to 12).

The Drew Central School District primarily serves the outlying areas of Monticello. It consists of Drew Central Elementary School (grades PreK to 4), Drew Central Middle School (grades 5 to 8), and Drew Central High School (grades 9 to 12).

Monticello also has two private academies. Monticello Christian Academy serves grades K through 12, and Grace Christian Academy serves grades K through 8.

Athletics
High School football is a popular community event; the Monticello High School Billies won the AAA (now AAAAA) state championship in 1994 and in 2009.

Post-secondary
Monticello is the home of the University of Arkansas at Monticello.

Media

Radio stations
KGPQ 99.9 FM, adult contemporary
KHBM 1430 AM
KHBM-FM 93.7 FM, classic rock

Newspaper
The Advance Monticellonian (weekly)
South Ark Weather (daily)
South Ark Daily (daily)

Notable people
 James Milton Carroll, Baptist pastor and historian
 Saul Davis, Negro league baseball player
 Rodney Shelton Foss, perhaps the first American killed in World War II
 Hershel Gober, former United States Deputy Secretary of Veterans Affairs
 Jesse Gonder, baseball player for New York Mets 
 Catherine Dorris Norrell, U.S. Representative, 1961-1963
 William F. Norrell, U.S. Representative, 1939-1961
 Eric Reed, Major League Baseball player
 William F. Slemons, U.S. Representative, 1875-1881
 Trent Harmon, winner of the 15th season of American Idol

In popular culture
 A season 5 episode of the Discovery Channel series A Haunting, called "The Haunting of Allen House", takes place in Monticello in 2005.

References

External links

 City of Monticello official website
 Drew Central School District
 Monticello (Drew County) entry in the Encyclopedia of Arkansas History & Culture
 Monticello Economic Development Commission

Monticello, Arkansas
Cities in Drew County, Arkansas
Cities in Arkansas
County seats in Arkansas
Populated places established in 1849
1849 establishments in Arkansas